is a 1980 jidaigeki film directed by Akira Kurosawa. It is set in the Sengoku period of Japanese history and tells the story of a lower-class criminal who is taught to impersonate the dying daimyō Takeda Shingen to dissuade opposing lords from attacking the newly vulnerable clan. Kagemusha is the Japanese term for a political decoy, literally meaning "shadow warrior". The film ends with the climactic 1575 Battle of Nagashino.

The film won the Palme d'Or at the 1980 Cannes Film Festival (tied with All That Jazz). It was also nominated for the Academy Award for Best Foreign Language Film and received other honours. In 2009 the film was voted at No. 59 on the list of The Greatest Japanese Films of All Time by Japanese film magazine Kinema Junpo.

Plot
During the Sengoku period, in 1571, Takeda Shingen, daimyō of the Takeda clan, meets a thief his brother Nobukado spared from crucifixion due to the thief's uncanny resemblance to Shingen; the brothers agree that he would prove useful as a double, and they decide to use the thief as a kagemusha, a political decoy. Later, while the Takeda army lays siege to a castle belonging to Tokugawa Ieyasu, Shingen is shot while listening to a flute playing in the enemy camp. He then orders his forces to withdraw and commands his generals to keep his death a secret for three years before succumbing to his wound. Meanwhile, Shingen's rivals Oda Nobunaga, Tokugawa Ieyasu, and Uesugi Kenshin each contemplate the consequences of Shingen's withdrawal, unaware of his death.

Nobukado presents the thief to Shingen's generals, proposing to have him impersonate Shingen full-time. Although the thief is unaware of Shingen's death initially, he eventually finds Shingen's preserved corpse in a large jar, having believed it to contain treasure. The generals then decide they cannot trust the thief and release him. Later, the jar is dropped into Lake Suwa, which spies working for the Tokugawa and Oda forces witness. Suspecting that Shingen has died, the spies go to report their observation, but the thief, having overheard the spies, returns to the Takeda forces and offers to work as a kagemusha. The Takeda clan preserves the deception by announcing that they were simply making an offering of sake to the god of the lake, and the spies are ultimately convinced by the thief's performance.

Returning home, the kagemusha successfully fools Shingen's retinue by imitating the late warlord's gestures and learning more about him. When the kagemusha must preside over a clan meeting, he is instructed by Nobukado to remain silent until Nobukado brings the generals to a consensus, whereupon the kagemusha will simply agree with the generals' plan and dismiss the council. However, Shingen's son Katsuyori is incensed by his father's decree of the three year subterfuge, which delays his inheritance and leadership of the clan. Katsuyori thus decides to test the kagemusha in front of the council, as the majority of the attendants are still unaware of Shingen's death. He directly asks the kagemusha what course of action should be taken, but the kagemusha is able to answer convincingly in Shingen's own manner, which further impresses the generals.

Soon, in 1573, Nobunaga mobilizes his forces to attack Azai Nagamasa, continuing his campaign in central Honshu to maintain his control of Kyoto against the growing opposition. When the Tokugawa and Oda forces launch an attack against the Takeda, Katsuyori begins a counter-offensive against the advice of his generals. The kagemusha is then forced to lead reinforcements in the Battle of Takatenjin, and helps inspire the troops to victory. In a fit of overconfidence however, the kagemusha attempts to ride Shingen's notoriously temperamental horse, and falls off. When those who rush to help him see that he does not have Shingen's battle scars, he is revealed as an impostor, and is driven out in disgrace, allowing Katsuyori to take over the clan. Sensing weakness in the Takeda clan leadership, the Oda and Tokugawa forces are emboldened to begin a full-scale offensive into the Takeda homeland.

By 1575, now in full control of the Takeda army, Katsuyori leads a counter-offensive against Nobunaga in Nagashino. Although courageous in their assault, several waves of Takeda cavalry and infantry are cut down by volleys of gunfire from Oda arquebusiers deployed behind wooden stockades, effectively eliminating the Takeda army. The kagemusha, who has followed the Takeda army, desperately takes up a spear and charges toward the Oda lines before being shot himself. Mortally wounded, the kagemusha attempts to retrieve the fūrinkazan banner, which had fallen into a river, but succumbs to his wounds in the water where his body is carried away by the current.

Production

George Lucas and Francis Ford Coppola are credited at the end of the film as executive producers in the international version. This is because they persuaded 20th Century Fox to make up a shortfall in the film's budget when the original producers, Toho Studios, could not afford to complete the film. In return, 20th Century Fox received the international distribution rights to the film. Coppola and Kurosawa appeared together in Suntory whisky commercials to raise money for the production.

Kurosawa originally cast the actor Shintaro Katsu in the title role. Katsu left the production, however, before the first day of shooting was over; in an interview for the Criterion Collection DVD, executive producer Coppola states that Katsu angered Kurosawa by arriving with his own camera crew to record Kurosawa's filmmaking methods. It is unclear whether Katsu was fired or left of his own accord, but he was replaced by Tatsuya Nakadai, a well-known actor who had appeared in a number of Kurosawa's previous films. Nakadai played both the kagemusha and the lord whom he impersonated.

Kurosawa wrote a part in Kagemusha for his longtime regular actor Takashi Shimura, and Kagemusha was the last Kurosawa film in which Shimura appeared. However, the scene in which he plays a servant who accompanies a western doctor to a meeting with Shingen was cut from the foreign release of the film. The Criterion Collection DVD release of the film restored this scene as well as approximately another eighteen minutes in the film.

According to Lucas, Kurosawa used 5,000 extras for the final battle sequence, filming for a whole day, then he cut it down to 90 seconds in the final release. Many special effects, and a number of scenes that filled holes in the story, landed on the "cutting-room floor".

Cast
 Kōji Shimizu as 
 Noburo Shimizu as 
 Sen Yamamoto as 
 Shuhei Sugimori as 
 Takashi Shimura as 
 Francis Selleck as Priest
 Jirō Yabuki as Equestrian
 Kamatari Fujiwara as Doctor

Release
Kagemusha was released theatrically in Japan on April 26, 1980, where it was distributed by Toho. It was released in the United States theatrically on October 6, 1980, where it was distributed by Twentieth Century Fox. The theatrical version in the United States had a 162-minute running time. It was released on home video in the United States with a 180-minute running time in 2005.

Box office
Kagemusha was the number one Japanese film on the domestic market in 1980, earning  in distribution rental income. It earned  within ten days of release at 217 Japanese theaters.

Overseas, the film grossed  in the United States (equivalent to over  adjusted for inflation in 2021) from  ticket sales.

Accolades
Kagemusha won numerous honours in Japan and abroad, marking the beginning of Kurosawa's most successful decade in international awards, the 1980s. At the 1980 Cannes Film Festival, Kagemusha shared the Palme d'Or with All That Jazz. Kagemusha was nominated for two Academy Awards: (Best Art Direction (Yoshirō Muraki) and Best Foreign Language Film).

In 2016, The Hollywood Reporter ranked the film 10th among 69 counted winners of the Palme d'Or to date, concluding "Set against the wars of 16th-century Japan, Kurosawa’s majestic samurai epic is still awe-inspiring, not only in its historical pageantry, but for imagery that communicates complex ideas about reality, belief and meaning."

See also
 List of submissions to the 53rd Academy Awards for Best Foreign Language Film
 List of Japanese submissions for the Academy Award for Best Foreign Language Film

References

Bibliography

External links

 
Kagemusha: From Painting to Film Pageantry an essay by Peter Grilli at the Criterion Collection
 Kagemusha  at the Japanese Movie Database

1980 films
1980s historical films
1980s war films
Jidaigeki films
1980s Japanese-language films
Japanese epic films
Samurai films
Films directed by Akira Kurosawa
Toho films
20th Century Fox films
Palme d'Or winners
Best Foreign Film César Award winners
Sengoku period in fiction
Films with screenplays by Akira Kurosawa
Films produced by Tomoyuki Tanaka
Films whose director won the Best Direction BAFTA Award
Cultural depictions of Takeda Shingen
Cultural depictions of Oda Nobunaga
Films set in the 1570s
1980 drama films
Japanese war drama films
Films about lookalikes
War epic films
1980s Japanese films